Triathlon (Spanish:Triatlón), for the 2013 Bolivarian Games, took place on 25 November and 27 November 2013. The two individual races for these Games are officially the sprint distance ones.

Medal table

Medalists

References

Events at the 2013 Bolivarian Games
2013 in triathlon
2013 Bolivarian Games